Soledar, formerly known as Karlo-Libknekhtovsk from 1965 to 1991, is a settlement in the Bakhmut Raion of Donetsk Oblast, Ukraine. It is a highly important salt-mining location, with the Soledar Salt Mine providing 95% of Ukraine's salt in 2021. 

The settlement was heavily damaged due to intense fighting during the 2022 Russian invasion of Ukraine, after which it came under Russian control on 11 January 2023. Since then, it has been occupied by Russia as part of the Donetsk People's Republic.

Geography

Natural features

Some are freshwater, while other parts are salty to the point that a person cannot dive deep, and gets pushed upwards.

In 2021, a schoolgirl from Zhytomyr Oblast did an experiment on the properties of the lake, and concluded that it could be possible to use it for energy production.

The salt extraction company Artemsil, which is based in the settlement, has said that the salt deposits of Soledar are "almost inexhaustible", and that in 300 years of exploitation, the salt reserves have only decreased by one percent.

Subordinate settlements 

Formerly an urban-type settlement of its own, in 1999, the Verkhovna Rada officially declared it administratively subordinate to Soledar. It is most notable for its large railway station, which serves as an essential hub station for shipping out Soledar's salt.

Its pre-war population was between 1,000-2,000. As of 2023, most if not all civilians have left because of the 2022 Russian invasion of Ukraine.

In 1926, its population included over 200 Volga Germans.

History
During the second half of the 17th century, the Don Cossacks settled in the region of Donbas. They built a village at the site of Soledar and named it Brіantsіvka. Salt mining on an industrial scale began in the settlement in 1881, by which time it was part of the Russian Empire. Over the following years, the scale increased, and hundreds of workers worked in the mines.

In 1926, by which time the settlement was within the Ukrainian SSR boundaries determined by the Soviets, it was renamed to Karlo-Libknekhtovsk, after the German socialist Karl Liebknecht. During World War II, the salt mines were destroyed, but later restored and returned to functionality. In 1965, it received the status of urban-type settlement.

In July 1991, the settlement changed its name to Soledar, which literally means "a gift of salt" in the Russian language, reflecting its prominent salt-mining industry.

In 2000, a Ukrainian scientist proposed to use Soledar's salt mines as a nuclear waste disposal site, believing that the inert environment would be useful. Residents of Soledar and neighboring Bakhmut had a negative response to the proposal. They held rallies and wrote letters to authorities, and eventually, regional authorities said that the plan would not be implemented.

Russo-Ukrainian War

War in Donbas (2014–2015) 

In February 2014, removal of pro-Russian Ukrainian President Victor Yanukovych during the Ukrainian Revolution caused backlash in southern and eastern Ukraine. In mid-April 2014, local pro-Russian militias that refused to recognise the new government captured several settlements in the Donetsk Oblast (including Soledar), which they wanted to separate from Ukraine as the Donetsk People's Republic. On 21 July 2014, Ukrainian forces recaptured the settlement from the militants. 

On 2 August 2014, Soledar was used as the base for the identification team and OSCE observers dealing with the MH17 plane crash due to its proximity to the site.

On 14 January 2015, after the separatists were expelled, the body of Ivan Reznichenko was found. Reznichenko was a deputy of the local council who had been missing since June of the last year. The press service of the political party Batkivshchyna said the criminals who killed him, who were now in custody, had been ordered to do so by the pro-Russian separatists.

Battle of Soledar (2022–2023) 
 
During the 2022 Russian invasion of Ukraine, on 28 May 2022, it was reported that a Russian missile had hit the Artemsil salt plant in the settlement. By the end of the month, Artemsil was forced to stop production due to constant Russian shelling.

The Battle of Soledar began in early August, with Russian forces capturing much of the eastern half of Soledar by September, although being stalled afterward. Starting on 27 December 2022, the Russian Wagner Group began a breakthrough attempt to take the settlement and return it to the control of the Donetsk People Republic, which by then had been annexed by Russia. The battle descended into heavy attritional fighting, and was called the "most bloody battle" of the war at the time. In early January 2023, after days of uncertainty as to whether Russia controlled the settlement, it was reported that Russia had definitively secured control of Soledar. 

By the end of the fighting, the settlement was largely destroyed, with Ukrainian President Volodymyr Zelensky saying that "barely any walls in Soledar remain[ed] standing". According to Donetsk Oblast governor Pavlo Kyrylenko, of the pre-invasion population of 10,490, only "559 civilians including 15 children" remained in the settlement by 13 January.

Economy

Mining and processing 

The main enterprises of the settlement are related to the mining and processing industries. The state enterprise Artemsil owns the Soledar Salt Mine, the largest salt mine in Europe.

In 2021, the mine provided 95% of Ukraine's salt. Outside of Ukraine, the company has exported salt to 22 countries, mostly in the former Soviet sphere. Russia used to be an important export destination in particular, with it making up a third of Artemsil's market value, and Artemsil having a 24% share of the Russian salt market until January 2015, when Russia abruptly suspended imports from the company.

There is also an abundance of gypsum that is mined, which is useful for construction materials. The Germany-based company Knauf Gips Donbas owns a factory in Soledar that produces plasterboard, and has invested tens of millions of dollars into the enterprise.

Salt mine tourism 

Soledar's long history of mining has created an "underground city" of tunnels that Deutsche Welle described as a "magnet for tourists".

In 2004 and 2006, a cave was repurposed to host classical music concerts by the Donetsk Symphony Orchestra underground. In September 2020, the same chamber was also used for a soccer (football) match. It was also host to the first-ever underground hot air balloon flight, as listed in the Guinness Book of Records.

Since the early 1990s, the chambers have also contained "speleosanatoriums": rooms made of salt that attempt to "recreate the allegedly restorative conditions of salt mines", where 100 patients with respiratory diseases are treated. This practice is part of the controversial halotherapy industry, in which it is believed that the inhalation of salt dust is a "miracle cure for respiratory illnesses".

Science
The  is located in Soledar. Its main purpose is to detect neutrino radiation from collapsing stars.

This location inside the salt mine was chosen because the "natural-radioactivity background in salt is approximately 300 times lower than in ordinary rock," thus minimizing radiation noise.

Demographics

The settlement's population has fallen over the past few decades, from 14,600 in 1971 to 10,490 in 2022.

Native language as of the Ukrainian Census of 2001: Ukrainian 60.10%, Russian 39.43%, Armenian 0.11%, Belarusian 0.09%, Romani 0.05%, Bulgarian 0.02%, Moldovan 0.02%, and one person each for Greek, Karaim, Polish and Romanian (0.01%).

Notable people
 Horden Brova, volleyball player
 Peter N. Fedorov, astronomer
 Anna Stetsenko, Paralympic swimmer

References

External links

 
Cities in Donetsk Oblast
Bakhmut Raion
Destroyed cities